The Search is the fourth studio album by American rapper NF. It was released on July 26, 2019, through NF Real Music and Caroline, and was preceded by the singles "Why", "The Search", "When I Grow Up" and "Time". It features a sole collaboration with Sasha Sloan. NF embarked on a North American tour in September and October 2019 in support of the album. Despite receiving mixed reviews from music critics, the album debuted atop the Billboard 200, becoming NF's second US No. 1 album.

Promotion
The album was announced along with the second single and title track, which "express[es] the hard quest [NF has] been on lately in his life with the help of rapid fire rap verses".

Critical reception

At Metacritic, which assigns a normalized rating out of 100 to reviews from mainstream critics, the album has an average score of 58 based on 6 reviews, indicating "mixed or average reviews". Writing for Pitchfork, Evan Rytlewski described the album as inducing a feeling of powerlessness and questioned how listeners "are supposed to respond to an album that often reads like a suicide note". Rytlewski wrote that NF "spends much of The Search darting in and out of an overbearing rappity-rap snarl-yell" and called his "struggles with mental illness [...] life-threatening", concluding that the album is an "unpleasant ride". Jon Caramanica was more sympathetic in his assessment for The New York Times, considering NF an "objectively strong rapper". However, he described the record as "alternately thrilling and draining" as well as "sometimes vigorous, sometimes exhausting", likening the listening experience to "living inside a snare drum during a marching band's halftime performance", and was critical of the lack of musical and lyrical variation on it. Chris DeVille of Stereogum wrote that while "the album's gothic heaviness sometimes suffocates its considerable pop acumen", its theme of struggle against mental health makes it "easy to see why legions of hurting kids gravitate to this music, especially those who reject the nihilism and hopelessness that defines many similar alternatives".

Commercial performance
The Search was initially predicted to debut at No. 2 on the US Billboard 200 with 95,000 album-equivalent units, 15,000 units behind Chance the Rapper's debut studio album The Big Day. The Search instead debuted at No. 1 with a larger-than-expected 130,000 units, 22,000 more than Chance the Rapper's album despite its extensive promotion and advantage in the area of streaming. 84,000 of these came from album sales. Its commercial success was aided by strong sales through the iTunes Store, merchandise and bundles through the rapper's web store as well as concert ticket/album sale redemption offers.

Track listing
The digital edition of the album features an edit of "Time" as the 20th track. Credits adapted from Tidal.

Charts

Weekly charts

Year-end charts

Certifications

References

2019 albums
NF (rapper) albums